The 1974 Bromley Council election took place on 2 May 1974 to elect members of Bromley London Borough Council in London, England. The whole council was up for election and the Conservative party stayed in overall control of the council.

Background

Election result

Ward results

References

1974
1974 London Borough council elections